David Bruce (born Marden Andrew McBroom; January 6, 1914 – May 3, 1976) was an American film actor. He was a company member of Peninsula Players Theatre in Fish Creek, Wisconsin in 1939.

Life and career 

Born in Kankakee, Illinois, Marden Andrew McBroom was known as "Andy" to his friends. McBroom entered Northwestern University in 1934 intending to study law but became a drama major.

In 1940, after extensive travel for theater work, McBroom made his way to California and signed with a Hollywood agent, Henry Willson. The agent changed his name to David Bruce and got him a stock contract at Warner Brothers. Bruce's first role was in the Errol Flynn movie The Sea Hawk (1940). The 6' 1" (1.85 m) actor was released from his Warner's contract to join the Naval Air Force at the outset of World War II, but he was discharged due to a chronic ear infection. After appearing in the John Wayne movie Flying Tigers (1942), Universal Pictures offered him a long-term contract. At the war's end, Universal did not renew Bruce's contract. During the 1950s, Bruce acted in several Columbia pictures, appeared on television, and wrote for television.

Personal life
He met his future wife, Cynthia Sory when she directed him in a Northwestern University production of Henry IV. Bruce was the father of singer-songwriter Amanda McBroom, who wrote the song The Rose, made popular by Bette Midler. His daughter wrote a tribute to her father in a song titled "Errol Flynn."
He was also the father of John Jolliffe, a psychologist in Orange County, CA.

Death
Bruce withdrew from acting after 1956. His wife died after a lengthy illness in 1962. Bruce eventually returned to Kankakee to work for a relative's promotional film company. Amanda McBroom's own burgeoning Hollywood acting career paved the way for Bruce's return to acting. Bruce died from a heart attack in Hollywood, California at the age of 62, immediately after wrapping his first scene on the film Moving Violations.

Legacy

Errol Flynn song 
Amanda McBroom says that the lyrics to her song about her father, Errol Flynn, are "absolutely" true, including that Errol Flynn was one of Bruce's best friends." Amanda McBroom confirms that excessive drinking "destroyed him for a while." The lyric that Bruce "died with his boots on" does not refer to the Errol Flynn movie (which Bruce did not appear in) but rather to the manner in which David Bruce died, on a film set as a working actor.

Selected filmography 

 The Man Who Talked Too Much (1940) – Gerald Wilson
 The Sea Hawk (1940) – Martin Burke
 River's End (1940) – Balt
 Money and the Woman (1940) – Bank Depositor (uncredited)
 Knute Rockne All American (1940) – Reporter When Knute is Ill (uncredited)
 A Dispatch from Reuters (1940) – Bruce
 East of the River (1940) – Student (uncredited)
 The Letter (1940) – Minor Role (uncredited)
 Santa Fe Trail (1940) – Phil Sheridan
 Flight from Destiny (1941) – Saunders
 The Sea Wolf (1941) – Young Sailor
 Singapore Woman (1941) – David Ritchie
 Sergeant York (1941) – Bert Thomas
 The Smiling Ghost (1941) – Paul Myron
 The Body Disappears (1941) – Jimmie Barbour
 Highways by Night (1942) – Herman – Desk Clerk (uncredited)
 Flying Tigers (1942) – Lt. Barton
 How's About It (1943) – Oliver
 Honeymoon Lodge (1943) – Horace Crump aka Bob Sterling
 Corvette K-225 (1943) – Lt. Rawlins
 You're a Lucky Fellow, Mr. Smith (1943) – Harvey Jones
 The Mad Ghoul (1943) – Ted Allison
 She's for Me (1943) – Michael Reed
 Calling Dr. Death (1943) – Robert Duval
 Gung Ho! (1943) – Larry O'Ryan
 Ladies Courageous (1944) – Frank Garrison
 Moon Over Las Vegas (1944) – Richard Corbett
 South of Dixie (1944) – Danny Lee
 Christmas Holiday (1944) – Gerald Tyler
 The Mummy's Ghost (1944) – Radio Announcer (voice, uncredited)
 Allergic to Love (1944) – J. Roger Mace
 Can't Help Singing (1944) – Dr. Robert Latham
 Salome Where She Danced (1945) – Cleve
 Lady on a Train (1945) – Wayne Morgan
 That Night with You (1945) – Johnny
 Susie Steps Out (1946) – Jeffrey Westcott
 Racing Luck (1948) – Jeff Stuart
 Adventures of Don Juan (1948) – Count D'Orsini (uncredited)
 Joe Palooka in the Big Fight (1949) – Tom Conway
 The Sickle or the Cross (1949) – George Hart
 Prejudice (1949) – Joe Hanson
 Young Daniel Boone (1950) – Daniel Boone
 The Great Plane Robbery (1950) – Carter
 Timber Fury (1950) – Jim Caldwell
 Hi-Jacked (1950) – Matt
 Pygmy Island (1950) – Maj. Bolton
 Revenue Agent (1950) – Cliff Gage
 The Du Pont Story (1950) – A young du Pont
 Pier 23 (1951) – Charles Giffen
 The Great Adventures of Captain Kidd (1953) – Alan Duncan
 The Iron Glove (1954) – Austrian Sergeant at Tavern (uncredited)
 Cannibal Attack (1954) – Arnold King
 Masterson of Kansas (1954) – Clay Bennett
 Jungle Hell (1956) – Dr. Paul Morrison 
 Moving Violation − Reporter 1 (final film role)

References

External links

American male film actors
Male actors from Illinois
People from Kankakee, Illinois
1914 births
1976 deaths
20th-century American male actors